The 2019 Ironman World Championship was a long distance triathlon competition held on October 12, 2019 in Kailua-Kona, Hawaii that was won by Jan Frodeno of Germany and Anne Haug of Germany. It was the 43rd edition of the Ironman World Championship, which has been held annually in Hawaii since 1978. The championship was organized by the World Triathlon Corporation (WTC) and awarded a total purse prize of $650,000. For Haug it was her first Ironman World Championship win. For Frodeno it was his third Ironman World Championship win.  Frodeno set a new overall course record previously set in 2018.

Championship results

Men

Women

Notes

Sources

References

External links
 Ironman website

Ironman

Sports competitions in Hawaii

2019 in sports in Hawaii
Ironman World Championship
Triathlon competitions in the United States